Bi-Centennial Padak (Bengali: দ্বিশত বর্ষপূর্তি পদক), is a military medal of Bangladesh. The medal was established in 1995 in honor of the 200th anniversary of the creation of the Bangladesh Rifles.

References 

Military awards and decorations of Bangladesh